Nam Cheong Central is one of the 25 constituencies in the Sham Shui Po District of Hong Kong which was created in 1991.

The constituency loosely covers central part of Sham Shui Po with the estimated population of 20,029.

Councillors represented

Election results

2010s

2000s

2000s

1990s

References

Constituencies of Hong Kong
Constituencies of Sham Shui Po District Council
1991 establishments in Hong Kong
Constituencies established in 1991
Shek Kip Mei